El Comercio is a Peruvian newspaper based in Lima. Founded in 1839, it is the oldest newspaper in Peru and one of the oldest Spanish-language papers in the world. It has a daily circulation of more than 120,000. It is one of the most influential media in Peru.

History

The military dictatorship of Juan Velasco Alvarado expropriated the newspaper in the mid-1970s. The company was returned to their original owners by President Fernando Belaúnde Terry on 28 July 1980, the same day he assumed office. It was his first official act upon assuming his presidency.

The newspaper is owned by shareholders of the Miró Quesada family, whose ownership of the company dates to 1875. Despite this, management is under control of an individual who is not a member of the family.

The company has ownership over its subsidiaries, the newspapers Peru 21 and Trome, and the magazine Somos.

The corporation, Empresa Editora El Comercio S.A., is the product of the merging of many companies in 1996. The company manages the editing, publication, and distribution of the newspaper, El Comercio, as well as the publication and distribution of Trome, Peru 21, and Gestion. In addition, they manage the advertising aspects of the mentioned publications. Additionally, they are devoted to the editing, publication, and distribution of many other books, magazines, pamphlets, weeklies, all sorts of graphic publications, Multimedia products, and videography. Informational content is distributed by their subsidiary Orbis Ventures S.A.C., a company in charge of the administration of the company's website.

The legal address of the company, where their administrative offices were in 300 Jr. Santa Rosa, Lima, Lima, Peru. Their publishing factories, Pando and Amauta, are in the districts of Pueblo Libre and the Cercado of Lima. 

The new legal address is in 171 Av. Jorge Salazar Araoz, La Victoria, Lima. 

Financially, the company operates very independently, as the effects of consolidation have not in large part affected the operation of their subsidiaries, Orbis Ventures S.A.C., Zetta Comunicadores del Perú S.A.E.M.A., EC Jobs S.A.C., Punto y Coma Editores S.A.C., Suscripciones Integrales S.A.C., Amauta Impressiones Comerciales, Producciones Cantabria S.A.C., Inmobiliaria El Sol S.A. and Grupo PluralTV.

Team of Ricardo Uceda
In 1994, Ricardo Uceda resigned as editor-in-chief of Sí to form a special investigative team at El Comercio. As with Uceda's Sí reporting, the Comercio team focused on cases of governmental corruption. One their most notable successes came in 1998, when they exposed the misuse of state funds intended for the survivors of floods and mudslides induced by the 1997-98 El Niño event; the story resulted in the arrest and imprisonment of Civil Defense Chief General Homero Nureña.

Political alignment
Its editorial principles defend economic liberalism. It can be said that his ideological position is center-right.

See also
 List of newspapers in Peru
 Media of Peru
América Televisión

References

Newspapers published in Peru
Spanish-language newspapers
Newspapers established in 1839
Mass media in Lima
1839 establishments in Peru